The Misegian, also known as Mikarew or Ruboni Range languages, are a small family of clearly related languages, 
 Giri, Sepen, and Mikarew (Aruamu).
They are generally classified among the Ramu languages of northern Papua New Guinea. The Misegian languages are all spoken in Yawar Rural LLG, Madang Province, Papua New Guinea.

Phonemes
Usher (2020) reconstructs the consonant inventory as follows:

{| 
| *m || *n ||  || *ŋ
|-
| *pʰ || *tʰ ||  || *kʰ
|-
| *p || *t ||  || *k 
|-
| *b || *d ||  || *g 
|-
| *ɸ || *s || || 
|-
| *w || *ɾ || *j || *ɣ
|}

{| 
| *i || *ʉ || *u
|-
| *ɛ || || *ɔ
|-
| || *a ||
|}

Pronouns
Usher reconstructs the pronouns as:
{| 
! !!sg!!du!!pl
|-
!1
| *[k/g][ɔ/u], naŋ || *[ŋ]ka || *aia
|-
!2
| *n[ɔ/u] || *[ŋ]kɔa || *nɛ
|-
!3
| *a(-na) || *mani || *mɛ
|}

As of 2020, these are tagged for revision.

References

External links 
 Timothy Usher, New Guinea World, Proto–Ruboni Range

 
Lower Ramu languages
Languages of Madang Province